Edelschrott is a municipality in the district of Voitsberg in the Austrian state of Styria.

Geography
Edelschrott lies halfway between Köflach and the Pack Pass.

References

Cities and towns in Voitsberg District